The Mesoregion of Araçatuba is one of the 15 mesoregions of the São Paulo state, Brazil. It is located at the northwest portion of the state, and has an area of 16,768.1 km².

The population of the mesoregion is 695,801 inhabitants (IBGE/2010), spread over 36 municipalities.

Municipalities
All data from IBGE/2010

Microregion of Andradina
Population: 190,536
Area (km²): 6,891.6
Population density (km²): 26.37

Andradina, Castilho, Guaraçaí, Ilha Solteira, Itapura, Mirandópolis, Murutinga do Sul, Nova Independência, Pereira Barreto, Sud Mennucci, Suzanápolis

Microregion of Araçatuba
Population: 256,560
Area (km²): 5,365.6
Population density (km²): 47.82

Araçatuba, Bento de Abreu, Guararapes, Lavínia, Rubiácea, Santo Antônio do Aracanguá, Valparaíso

Microregion of Birigüi
Population: 257,531
Area (km²): 4,510.9
Population density (km²): 57.09

Alto Alegre, Avanhandava, Barbosa, Bilac, Birigüi, Braúna, Brejo Alegre, Buritama, Clementina, Coroados, Gabriel Monteiro, Glicério, Lourdes, Luiziânia, Penápolis, Piacatu, Santópolis do Aguapeí, Turiúba

References

Aracatuba